Gëzim Kasmi (25 July 1942 – 17 October 2016) was an Albanian footballer who played for 17 Nëntori Tirana (present day KF Tirana) and the Albania national team.

International career
He made his debut for Albania in a June 1963 Olympic Games qualification match against Bulgaria and earned a total of 8 caps, scoring no goals. His final international was a May 1971 Olympic Games qualification match against Romania.

Honours
Albanian Superliga: 4
 1965, 1966, 1968, 1970

References

External links

1942 births
2016 deaths
Footballers from Tirana
Albanian footballers
Association football fullbacks
Albania international footballers
KF Tirana players
KF Skrapari players